The Battle of Wesenberg, Rakvere or Rakovor was a battle fought on 18 February  1268 between the combined forces of Danish Duchy of Estonia, Bishopric of Dorpat, Livonian branch of the Teutonic Knights, and local Estonian militia on one side and the forces of Novgorod and Pskov, led by Dmitry of Pereslavl, on the other. Medieval accounts of the battle vary with both sides claiming victory, however the Livonian victory being more plausible as Novgorodian-Pskovian forces retreated out of Danish Estonia, with Livonian Knights launching a retaliatory attack on Izborsk and Pskov soon afterward, in June 1269.

Account of the Livonian Rhymed Chronicle 
According to the Livonian Rhymed Chronicle, the only contemporary primary source describing the battle whose text survives in unaltered form to the present day, the combined forces of the two Russian republics invaded the territory of Danish Estonia in January 1268 where they commenced with looting of the countryside. The Danish vassals requested reinforcements from the neighboring territories ruled by the Livonian Order and the Bishopric of Dorpat, which they received in the form of 34 Brothers from castles Weissenstein, Leal and Fellin plus an unknown number of lesser troops, and from the Bishopric an unknown number of men under the leadership of Bishop Alexander of Dorpat. The contingent of the Livonian Knights was most likely led by a castellan of one of the aforementioned castles, as the Master of the Order, Otto von Lutterberg, was campaigning in the south, in Semgallia (Otto was in Riga on January 16).

When all the forces were assembled the native Estonian troops were positioned on the left flank, which they were told to hold during the battle, while the larger group, the Danish king's men, were stationed on the right. The Brothers and their men are mentioned as having fought on all fronts. The death of Bishop Alexander is listed early in the description of the battle. Two formations of Russians advanced upon them but were beaten back and forced to retreat across a broad field, the retreat turning into a rout and a pursuit. Then Prince Dimitri, who is complimented by the chronicler as being brave, managed to regroup about 5,000 men for a counterattack, while the rest of his army had fled. The Brothers' forces met Dimitri's attack along a deep river. At that point the Brothers are mentioned as having 180 men plus 80 footsoldiers. The footsoldiers led an attack upon a bridge. Then the Brothers joined the attack and the battle was over with 5,000 Russians dead, the rest defeated and routed.

Since the Livonian Rhymed Chronicle also includes battles in which it describes the forces of the Livonian Order (or its predecessor, the Livonian Brothers of the Sword) as on the losing side—like the Battle of Saule or Battle on the Ice—, there is little reason to doubt that the outcome of this battle is stated correctly.

Account of the Chronicle of Novgorod 

The Chronicle of Novgorod, 1016–1471, is the main Russian source describing the battle. However, the chronicle was rewritten on multiple occasions, most notably in the 15th century and edited according to the political ideology of the era.

According to the Chronicle of Novgorod, the united Russian forces crossed the Narva River and moved towards Rakvere but did not take the town. They looted the countryside and found a huge cave filled with Chuds (Estonians). Unable to attack the hiding Estonians for three days, the Russians finally devise a way to channel some water into the cave which forces the Estonians to flee and many of them are slain. Then the Russians advanced on Rakvere and met the German force at Kegola river. The Russian forces without delay crossed the river and organized their battle lines by placing the men from Pskov on the right, Dmitri's force on the right higher up, the remainder of the Novgorodian forces forming up in the center and on the right. The German iron troops are described as advancing in a great wedge. Then the chronicle lists a long string of names of boyars who were slain in the battle while knyaz Yuri fled. However the Germans are pushed back and pursued as far as the town. At that time another German wedge attacks the Russian transport but due to nightfall the Germans and the Russian main force do not engage each other. The two forces end up facing each other over a close distance but the Germans flee from the battlefield before the sun rises.

References

1268 in Europe
Battles involving the Novgorod Republic
Battles involving the Livonian Order
Battles involving Estonia
Battles in Estonia
Conflicts in 1268
Rakvere
13th century in Estonia